Vivienne Gapes (formerly Vivienne Martin, born 17 June 1959) is a Paralympic medalist from New Zealand who competed in alpine skiing.  She competed in the 1984 Winter Paralympics where she won a gold in giant slalom and a pair of silver medals in downhill and alpine combination. Two years later she won the same medal haul with a gold in giant slalom, silver in downhill and silver in alpine combination at the 1986 IPC Alpine Skiing World Championships in Sälen, Sweden.

References

External links 
 
 

1959 births
Living people
New Zealand female alpine skiers
Paralympic alpine skiers of New Zealand
Paralympic gold medalists for New Zealand
Paralympic silver medalists for New Zealand
Paralympic medalists in alpine skiing
Alpine skiers at the 1984 Winter Paralympics
Medalists at the 1984 Winter Paralympics
20th-century New Zealand women